Workpoint Entertainment Public Company Limited is a Thai media company. The company and its subsidiaries do business in television production, film making, event management, animation, publishing, event marketing and recording. The company, which has been called "the No. 1 TV producer in Thailand" by the Hollywood Reporter, has produced over eighty television programmes, with fifteen programmes broadcast weekly on free television in 2011. Mainly focusing on game shows, Workpoint's first production was Wethi Thong (Golden Stage), which was broadcast on Channel 7 from 1989 to 2007. It soon expanded into other genres and has produced variety shows, soap operas, sitcoms, animations and feature films. Its productions include the Asian Television Award-winning Game Jarachon, Fan Pan Tae, Todsagun Kid Game, Lharn Phoo Koo E-Joo and Wittaya Subphayuth. Two of its productions, Lharn Phoo Koo E-Joo and Talok Hok Chak, have also received nominations for the International Emmy Awards.

Workpoint's productions have from time to time been the subject of various controversies. Popular programmes including Fan Pan Tae, Todsagun Game and Tpop have seen criticisms of inaccuracy and allegations of being rigged. In 2012, the second season of Thailand's Got Talent became subject of intense criticism when a contestant who displayed her breasts on stage was revealed to have been paid by the organisers in order to boost ratings.

TV Business 
Can be divided into 3 types as follows
 TV program business broadcasting on digital television channels under the name Workpoint Channel number 23'''
 Television programs broadcast online
 Business of distributing television broadcasting rights (Licensing)

Television program franchise

Big Box

Black Box

Ching Roi Ching Lan

Drive Me Home

Gang of Gags

Gang of Ghosts

Generation Gap

Lightning Quiz

Little Big Gang

Love Blood

Mic On Debt Off

Office Syndrome

Outlaw Beauty

Seven Days

Spy Game

Super Muaythai

The Band

The Fan

The Innocent Face

Who's This

Secret of Numbers

Black Sheep

Super 10

Little Lightning

Love Judge

The Rapper

The Wall Song

10 Fight 10

See also
:Category:Television series by Workpoint Entertainment

References

External links
Website

Mass media companies of Thailand
Mass media companies established in 1989
Companies listed on the Stock Exchange of Thailand
1989 establishments in Thailand